Alan McRitchie is an Australian rugby league footballer who played in the 1960s. He played for St. George Dragons and Cronulla-Sutherland as a prop.  He was an inaugural player for Cronulla and played in the club's first ever game.

Playing career

St. George

McRitchie began his first grade career with St George in 1964.  McRitchie mainly played reserve grade for the club appearing in 11 first grade appearances over 3 seasons.  Alan McRitchie did not play in any of the first grade grand final teams during the club's 11 year premiership reign although he was a member of the premiership winning Reserve Grade team of 1964.

Cronulla Sharks

In 1967, McRitchie signed with newly admitted team Cronulla and played in the club's first ever game which was an 11–5 victory over Eastern Suburbs at the Sydney Sports Ground.  Cronulla went on to finish last in their inaugural season winning only 2 further games.  McRitchie played another 2 years with Cronulla and his last season in first grade ended with another wooden spoon in 1969.

Alan McRitchie was the son of the former St. George Dragons player, Bill McRitchie.

References

St. George Dragons players
Cronulla-Sutherland Sharks players
Australian rugby league players
Rugby league players from Sydney
Rugby league props
Living people
1942 births